Elections were held in the Australian state of Queensland on 7 March 1953 to elect the 75 members of the state's Legislative Assembly. The Labor government was seeking its eighth continuous term in office since the 1932 election. It was the first electoral test for Vince Gair, who had become Premier of Queensland 14 months earlier after the death of Ned Hanlon.

Key dates

Results

The result was a considerable swing to the Labor government.

|}

 737,579 electors were enrolled to vote at the election; however, 11 seats (14.7% of the total) were uncontested, eight of them Labor-held seats representing 49,466 enrolled voters, as well as two Country seats representing 20,053 voters and one Liberal seat representing 10,711 voters.

Seats changing party representation

This table lists changes in party representation at the 1953 election.

 Members listed in italics did not recontest their seats.
 In addition, Labor retained the seat of Kedron, which it had won from the Liberals at the 1951 by-election.

See also
 Members of the Queensland Legislative Assembly, 1950–1953
 Members of the Queensland Legislative Assembly, 1953–1956
 Candidates of the Queensland state election, 1953
 Gair Ministry

References

Elections in Queensland
1953 elections in Australia
1950s in Queensland
March 1953 events in Australia